The 2002 Mississippi Valley State Delta Devils football team represented Mississippi Valley State University as a member of East Division of the Southwestern Athletic Conference (SwAC) during the 2002 NCAA Division I-AA football season. Led by first-year head coach Willie Totten, the played their home games at Rice–Totten Stadium in Itta Bena, Mississippi. Mississippi Valley State finished the season with an overall record of 5–6 and a mark of 3–4 in conference play, tying for third in the SWAC's East Division.

Schedule

References

Mississippi Valley State
Mississippi Valley State Delta Devils football seasons
Mississippi Valley State Delta Devils football